John Gordon (March 3, 1928 – June 27, 2022) was a Canadian ice hockey manager, coach and player.   Gordon played 36 games in the National Hockey League with the New York Rangers.  He was also head coach of the Minnesota North Stars from 1970 to 1973, general manager of the North Stars from 1974 to 1978 and general manager of the Vancouver Canucks from 1985 to 1987.

AHL career
Despite seeing limited NHL action, Gordon was a consistent scoring threat over a long 14-year career in the American Hockey League. He made his first appearance as a 19-year-old in 1947 with the New Haven Ramblers. Two years later, he recorded 60 assists, good for second in the league, and 83 points. He was acquired by the Cincinnati Mohawks in 1951 and was the leading scorer in his one season with the club. Gordon then spent eight years as a major contributor with the Cleveland Barons. He scored 102 points in 1954, which was good for second in the AHL, as his team won the Calder Cup. In 1957, he also became coach of the Barons, and he led the squad to another Calder Cup in his first year. After the 1959 season, he retired as a player, but he served three more years as coach. He returned to coach the team during the 1969 and 1970 teams, after a three-year stint as assistant GM of the New York Rangers concluded.

NHL Coaching record

References

External links
 

1928 births
2022 deaths
Canadian ice hockey centres
Canadian ice hockey coaches
Minnesota North Stars coaches
Minnesota North Stars executives
New York Rangers executives
New York Rangers players
New York Rovers players
Ice hockey people from Winnipeg
Vancouver Canucks general managers